This is a list of the England national under-21 football team results from 2000 to 2019 (Matches 179 to 381).

November 2019 squad
Players born on or after 1 January 1998 will be eligible until the completion of the 2021 UEFA European Under-21 Championship.

The following players were named in the squad for fixtures against Albania and the Netherlands, played in November 2019.

Recent call-ups
The following players have previously been called up to the England under-21 squad and remain eligible.

Past squads
 2000 UEFA European Under-21 Football Championship squad
 2002 UEFA European Under-21 Football Championship squad
 2007 UEFA European Under-21 Football Championship squad
 2009 UEFA European Under-21 Football Championship squad
 2011 UEFA European Under-21 Football Championship squad
 2013 UEFA European Under-21 Football Championship squad
 2015 UEFA European Under-21 Football Championship squad
 2017 UEFA European Under-21 Football Championship squad
 2019 UEFA European Under-21 Football Championship squad

2000s

2000

2001

2002

2003

2004

2005

2006

2007

2008

2009

2010

2011

2012

2013

2014

2015

2016

2017

2018

2019

References

England national under-21 football team